Giuliano di Simone (late 14th century - early 15th century) was an Italian painter, active near Lucca and Pisa in a late Gothic-style. He worked in a style reminiscent of Spinello Aretino. Giuliano is known for only one signed work, an Enthroned Madonna and Child (1389) located in the church of San Michele in Castiglione di Garfagnana.

References

14th-century births
15th-century deaths
15th-century Italian painters
Italian male painters
Painters from Tuscany
Gothic painters